Under UK insolvency law an insolvent company can enter into a company voluntary arrangement (CVA).  The CVA is a form of composition, similar to the personal IVA (individual voluntary arrangement), where an insolvency procedure allows a company with debt problems or that is insolvent to reach a voluntary agreement with its business creditors regarding repayment of all, or part of its corporate debts over an agreed period of time.  The application for a CVA can be made by the agreement of all directors of the company, the legal administrators of the company, or the appointed company liquidator.

Implementation
A company voluntary arrangement can only be implemented by an insolvency practitioner who will draft a proposal for the creditors. A meeting of creditors is held to see if the CVA is accepted. As long as 75% (by debt value) of the creditors who vote agree then the CVA is accepted. All the company creditors are then bound to the terms of the proposal whether or not they voted. Creditors are also unable to commence further legal action as long as the terms are adhered to, and existing legal action such as a winding-up order ceases.

During the CVA, payments are made in a single monthly amount paid to the insolvency practitioner. The fees charged by the insolvency practitioner will be deducted from these payments. The company is not required to fund any further costs. Companies House will register the fact the company is entering into a CVA and there will be a recording of it on its credit file.

Overview

In order to place a company into a company voluntary arrangement (CVA), there is a certain process that must be followed to assess viability for the arrangement and to set up this business recovery process.

The CVA process involves:
 Contact with an insolvency practitioner (IP) – the company's current financial position will need to be discussed to discover the options available to help deal with issues. The IP will work with the company's directors to decide if a CVA is most appropriate. This consultation and any advice given will normally be free of charge.
 Information gathering – if it is decided that a CVA is the best way forward, the IP will be formally engaged to gather information and draft a proposal to be presented to the company's unsecured creditors.
 The drafting of the CVA proposal – the proposal will include a number of things such as:
 How the financial difficulty arose/came about
 Up to date information regarding the company's financial position including details of all assets and liabilities
 How much the company can afford to pay on a monthly basis based on financial projections
 How much it will pay a month which creditors will receive on a pro rata basis
 The predicted duration of the CVA.
 Review of the CVA draft proposal – after the draft has been put together, the directors of the company entering into the agreement should review the proposal and make any necessary changes. Once agreed upon, a copy of the proposal is sent out to all creditors and shareholders.
 CVA moratorium – to reduce/avoid creditor pressure, an application can be made to the court for a CVA moratorium. If this is granted and put in place, it stops the company's creditors from taking legal action and provides breathing space to deal with any issues. A CVA moratorium is difficult to obtain so their use is rare but they can be very useful for insolvency practitioners dealing with CVAs.
 An informal agreement with unsecured creditors – an alternative to a CVA moratorium which can be easier to put in place is an informal agreement with unsecured creditors. It also puts a stop to legal action by the company's creditors before agreement of the CVA. Most insolvency practices will contact unsecured creditors immediately after appointment to inform them of the company's situation. They will also try to keep a working relationship between the company and their creditors so trading can continue and profit can be made in order to repay creditors. 
 Creditors' meeting – there should be a minimum of 14 days’ notice given to creditors and shareholders prior to this meeting. It is not obligatory for a director to attend the meeting and creditors can vote in person or via a proxy, such as by post or email. At least 75% of creditors need to vote in favour of the proposal to approve it. If it is not acceptable, the proposal will need to be revised and resubmitted for approval. 
 There will be a second creditors' vote where connected creditors are excluded. A connected creditor could be a director or employee owed money from the company. At this meeting, 50% of creditors will need to vote in favour in order for the CVA proposal to be approved.
 After approval, the CVA will begin – the CVA will be put in place and payments, at the agreed monthly amounts, will start. The insolvency practitioner will collect money monthly and distribute it to creditors on a pro-rata basis. The terms of the CVA are binding for the company and its creditors for its duration and creditors will not be able to pursue the company legally if the agreement is adhered to.
 Part of the proposal may involve one or more lump-sum payments (e.g. on receipt of an anticipated insurance claim or perhaps on completion of a large contract).
 The end of the agreement – a CVA will finish at the end of the agreed term if all payments have been made and conditions within the proposal have been followed. At the end of the CVA period, if there is debt outstanding, it may be written off or in some circumstances the CVA can be extended. Creditors can receive anything from 1p to 100p in the pound.

Potential benefits
Companies can benefit from a CVA in numerous ways:

 Improves cash flow, quickly.
 Stops pressure from tax while the CVA is being prepared.
 Stops a winding-up petition and gets it adjourned.
 Can rapidly cut costs.
 Can terminate employment, leases and onerous supply contracts.
 Terminates property lease obligations.
 Terminates directors’ and/or managers’ contracts.
 Removes employees with no redundancy payments or lieu-of-notice costs.
 Terminates onerous customer/supplier contracts.
 Board and shareholders generally remain in control of the company.
 Has much lower costs than administration and is not publicly announced like administration is.
 Is a good deal for creditors as they retain the customer and receive some of their debt back over time.

Role of directors
Within a CVA, directors retain control of the business.

Directors have a legal duty to act properly and responsibly and to prioritise the interests of their creditors. The risks of liquidating a business may include disqualification from acting as a director of other companies and also personal reputation as a director. In an extreme case directors can be found personally liable to contribute towards the shortfall in payments to creditors. However, as a company voluntary arrangement is in the best interests of creditors, there is no investigation into the director's conduct.

Under a company voluntary arrangement directors are not personally liable for the company's debts, unless they have given a personal guarantee. Even if a director has provided a guarantee, a CVA will mean a director is only liable if the company cannot pay and by continuing in business there is a retained source of income.

See also
UK company law
US insolvency law

References

Insolvency law of the United Kingdom
United Kingdom company law